Crater, also Kraytar, is a district of the Aden Governorate, Yemen. Its official name is Seera (Arabic: صيرة Ṣīrah). It is situated in a crater of an ancient volcano which forms the Shamsan Mountains. In 1991, the population was 70,319. As of 2003, the district had a population of 76,723 people.

History
In the closing days of British rule in 1967, Crater District became the focus of the Aden Emergency, sometimes called the last imperial war. After a mutiny of hundreds of soldiers in the South Arabian Federation Army on 20 June, all British forces withdrew from Crater. Crater was occupied by Arab fighters while British forces blocked off its two main entrances. In July, a British infantry battalion, led by Lt. Col. Colin Mitchell of the Argyll and Sutherland Highlanders, entered Crater and managed to occupy the entire district overnight with no casualties. Nevertheless, deadly guerrilla attacks soon resumed, with the British leaving Aden by the end of November 1967, earlier than had been planned by British prime minister Harold Wilson and without an agreement on the succeeding governance.

Geography

Climate
Crater's climate is dominated all year by the subtropical anticyclone, or subtropical high, with its descending air, elevated inversions and clear skies.  The Köppen Climate Classification subtype for this climate is BWh (Tropical and Subtropical Desert).

References

Districts of Aden Governorate
Aden Governorate